Robert E. Kelly (born September 27, 1972) is an American political analyst on inter-Korean affairs and associate professor in political science at Pusan National University. In March 2017, he and his family rose to fame when his live interview on BBC World News was sequentially gatecrashed by his children and wife.

Early life and education
Originally from Cuyahoga County, Ohio, Kelly in 1994 graduated Phi Beta Kappa from Miami University with a BA in history and political science. Following his undergraduate studies, he attended Ohio State University and obtained an MA in international relations in 2002 and a Ph.D. in international relations in 2005 and wrote a dissertation titled, The Impact of Non-Governmental Organizations on the Bretton Woods Institutions. He studied in Germany and had an internship in the German Bundestag. He speaks German fluently.

Career

Kelly is an associate professor of international relations in the Department of Political Science and Diplomacy at Pusan National University in Busan, South Korea. As a political analyst on inter-Korean affairs, he contributes to print and televised media, and has been referred to as a "damn good Korea analyst" by one of his peers. He has made media appearances on the BBC World News, China Central Television and Al Jazeera and has written for several publications including The Diplomat and Foreign Affairs. He has also provided expert opinion for The Washington Post and The New York Times. Kelly is furthermore a prolific contributor to The Interpreter, published by the Australian think tank Lowy Institute.

BBC News interview (2017)
On March 10, 2017, he and his family rose to fame when his live interview by James Menendez on the impeachment of Park Geun-hye, the President of South Korea, for the BBC World News from his home office was sequentially gatecrashed by his four-year-old daughter and nine-month-old son entering the room, then his wife, Jung-a Kim, sliding in to drag them out while knocking books off an air-mattress, before closing the door on her knees. The interview continued as normal, with the BBC News hailing the video as their favorite live TV moment of the week. It became a Twitter Moment and quickly went viral with all four family members becoming individual memes. In just one day, the video had over 6 million views on YouTube and became the No. 1 trending video on YouTube in the UK, later being named  10 on YouTube's list of the top 10 trending videos of 2017.

Many viewers and journalists incorrectly assumed the woman in the video was Kelly's nanny instead of his wife.

Kelly and his family returned to television on March 14 for an interview about the incident. In December 2017 he said that "for two weeks we were the most famous family on earth" but he thought it could be "the end of my career as a talking head."

Variety shows
Kelly's fame arising from the viral video led to his appearance on a South Korean reality television show that focuses on the struggles of fathers raising young children.

Select bibliography

References

External links

 

 

1972 births
Living people
American expatriates in South Korea
American political scientists
Experts on North Korea
Miami University alumni
Ohio State University Graduate School alumni
People from Cuyahoga County, Ohio
Viral videos